Vincent Jean Carillot (March 25, 1927 – December 24, 2020) was an American football coach. He attended Michigan State University in 1947, received both bachelor's and master's degrees there, and was an assistant football coach, handling the defensive backfield, for eight years. He was the head football coach for the Tulsa Golden Hurricane football team during the 1969 season. In 1970, Carillot resigned during an NCAA probe into alleged recruiting violations at Tulsa.

Head coaching record

College

References

1927 births
2020 deaths
Michigan State Spartans football coaches
Tulsa Golden Hurricane football coaches
High school football coaches in Michigan
Michigan State University alumni